IEEE Transactions on Microwave Theory and Techniques (T-MTT) is a monthly peer-reviewed scientific journal with a focus on that part of engineering and theory associated with microwave/millimeter-wave technology and components, electronic devices, guided wave structures and theory, electromagnetic theory, and Radio Frequency Hybrid and Monolithic Integrated Circuits, including mixed-signal circuits, from a few MHz to THz. 

T-MTT is published by the IEEE Microwave Theory and Techniques Society. T-MTT was established in 1953 as the Transactions of the IRE Professional Group on Microwave Theory and Techniques. From 1955 T-MTT was published as the IRE Transactions on Microwave Theory and Techniques and was finally the current denomination since 1963.

The editors-in-chief is Jianguo Ma (Guangdong University of Technology). According to the Journal Citation Reports, the journal has a 2020 impact factor of 3.599.

References

External links 

Transactions on Microwave Theory and Techniques
Physics journals
Monthly journals
Publications established in 1963
English-language journals
Microwave technology
Electronics journals